Fallopia dumetorum, also known as copse bindweed, is a species of flowering plant in the family Polygonaceae, native to temperate Eurasia.

References

dumetorum
Flora of Europe
Flora of temperate Asia
Plants described in 1762